John Henry "Joe" Rowe (26 May 1901 – 21 July 1968) was an Australian rules footballer who played with Richmond in the Victorian Football League (VFL).

He was the older brother of North Melbourne player Claude Rowe.

Notes

External links 

1901 births
1968 deaths
Australian rules footballers from Victoria (Australia)
Richmond Football Club players
Eaglehawk Football Club players